Dil Hai Chota Sa Choti Si Aasha  is an Indian television reality game show hosted by Jay Soni and Ragini Khanna. It started on 14 September 2014 and aired every Sunday on Sony Pal. The show is produced by White Script and executed by SOL productions.

Concept
The show starts with four women from different backgrounds who have emotional and inspiring stories. They are invited to play through different rounds and collect virtual money. At the end of the show, Sony Pal converts the winning sum into cash, which can help empower the women going forward.

References

External links
 WhiteScript.net

Indian game shows
Hindi-language television shows
Sony Pal original programming
2014 Indian television series debuts
2014 Indian television series endings